"Nightswimming" is a song by American alternative rock band R.E.M., released in July 1993 as the fifth single from their eighth album, Automatic for the People (1992). The song is a ballad featuring singer Michael Stipe accompanied only by bassist Mike Mills on piano (lyrics and music respectively, but credited to the whole band as usual), a string arrangement by former Led Zeppelin bassist John Paul Jones, and a prominent oboe by Deborah Workman in the latter part of the piece. Stipe sings about a group of friends who go skinny dipping at night, which draws from similar experiences in the band's early days.

Background and recording
Bassist Mike Mills recalled he was playing a piano riff at John Keane's studio in the band's hometown of Athens, Georgia. While Mills almost discarded the melody, it attracted the interest of singer Michael Stipe. Mills said, "I never thought it would amount to much because it was just a circular thing that kept going round and round and round. But it inspired Michael." While the song was not included on Out of Time, the demo recorded during those sessions was used for Automatic for the People, with a string arrangement by John Paul Jones added to the track. Mills has also claimed he recorded the piano part at Criteria Studios in Miami, on the same piano used by Derek and the Dominos on the recording of "Layla".

"[Michael] listened once, nodded his head to hear it again, and on the second pass he sang the lyrics. It was 'Nightswimming,' exactly like the record we would record a year later," explained Peter Buck in 2003. "I was standing in the corner, dumbfounded."

Composition and lyrics
 "Nightswimming" was the only R.E.M. song for which the lyric was written before the music. It was performed by Michael Stipe and Mike Mills; Stipe sings while Mills plays the piano. R.E.M. guitarist Peter Buck noted that the absence of drummer Bill Berry and himself from the song was typical of many tracks on Automatic for the People, where one or more band members would not appear on a given song. Mills plays a piano motif he has referred to as "circular" in nature.

The inspiration for the song has been debated by the band members. Stipe, in a 2001 Esquire article, suggested an origin of the song. "A few years ago, I wanted to write a song about night watchmen, so I hired one to guard the R.E.M. offices in Athens. I bought him a uniform and a flashlight and everything. He turned out to be kind of crazy and called me up in the middle of the night to tell me dirty stories about the Kennedys. I wrote the song about him, but he was so paranoid he said he was going to sue me, so I changed the lyric from 'Night watchman' to 'Nightswimming.'"

Conversely in the past, Mills said, "It's based on true events", explaining that in the early 1980s R.E.M. and its circle of friends would go skinny dipping after the Athens clubs closed at night. "We'd go to parties, we'd go to the clubs and we'd go to the Ball Pump, and there would be any number of these same 50 people, so it was a very tight circle of friends." Peter Buck holds a similar interpretation. However, Stipe has denied that that is the topic of the song; rather, Stipe says the song is about a "kind of an innocence that's either kind of desperately clung onto or obviously lost." Stipe said there are autobiographical elements to the song, but insists most of it is "made up."

Reception
"Nightswimming" was released as a single on July 12, 1993. The record reached number 27 in the United Kingdom and number 71 in Australia.

Steven Hyden wrote for The A.V. Club, "Automatic for the People might be the most quietly serene rock record about loss ever made. There is no fear in this music; death is the album's main character, but he's presented as a vehicle for self-empowerment ("Try Not to Breathe"), immortality ("Man on the Moon"), and spiritual fulfillment ("Find the River"). On "Nightswimming", death returns to his home in the past, and memory is revealed as the last light emanating from a star that has burned out."

In his weekly UK chart commentary, James Masterton wrote, "And still they keep on plugging. R.E.M.'s fifth hit from the album is in a similar vein to "Everybody Hurts" which became their biggest hit ever back in May. Similar success may be difficult for this song, not being quite as universal as the last and due to the fact that the album Automatic For The People is now one of the biggest sellers of the year so far." Alan Jones from Music Week gave the song four out of five and named it Pick of the Week. He declared it as a "rather intense song", adding that "The usual assortment of exclusive live tracks will convert this into another big hit." Parry Gettelman from Orlando Sentinel felt that "a repetitive piano riff and swelling strings overwhelm the slight tune." In a 1992 review of the album, Rolling Stone writer Paul Evans said, "R.E.M. has never made music more gorgeous than 'Nightswimming'", calling it a "masterpiece".

In 2011, a Rolling Stone Readers Poll ranked "Nightswimming" as R.E.M.’s second best song, behind "Losing My Religion". Rolling Stone noted, “The track didn't do that well as a single, but in the past 20 years it's slowly become one of R.E.M.'s most beloved songs.”

In 2021, it was listed at No. 160 on Rolling Stone's "Top 500 Greatest Songs of All Time."

Music video
A music video was produced to promote the single, directed by filmmaker Jem Cohen. Two versions of the video were made with the uncensored version of the video included on the Parallel video compilation. The British version was later published on YouTube in October 2009, and had generated more than 10 million views as of January 2023.

Cover versions

A cover of the song by Dashboard Confessional is featured on disc two of their album A Mark, A Mission, A Brand, A Scar.

Another cover of the song by British-alternative group Gene is featured as a B-side to their 1997 single "Where Are They Now?".

The song was performed by Coldplay with Michael Stipe on their Austin City Limits performance.  During the show, Chris Martin called "Nightswimming" "the best song ever written."

Ingrid Michaelson created a cover based around using a looper pedal for a charity event at Carnegie Hall.

The song was performed by Sugarland  on their 2009 live album Live on the Inside.

"Nightswimming" is also included on the Stereogum Presents... Drive XV: A Tribute to Automatic for the People with versions by The Wrens and You Say Party! We Say Die!.

Azure Ray, who originally formed in Athens, covered "Nightswimming" on their 2018 EP Waves.

Jason Isbell and the 400 Unit covered the song on their 2021 album Georgia Blue.

Track listing
All songs written by Bill Berry, Peter Buck, Mike Mills and Michael Stipe.

 7" Single
 "Nightswimming" – 4:16
 "Losing My Religion" (acoustic live) – 4:55

 12" and CD Maxi-Single
 "Nightswimming" – 4:16
 "World Leader Pretend" (acoustic live) – 5:16
 "Belong" (acoustic live) – 4:40
 "Low" (acoustic live) – 4:59

(All four acoustic live b-sides recorded live in Charleston, April 28, 1991, for the Mountain Stage radio program. "Losing My Religion", "Belong" and "Low" all taken from the album Out of Time)

Charts

Certifications

References
Black, Johnny. Reveal: The Story of R.E.M. Backbeat Books, 2004. 
Buckley, David. R.E.M.: Fiction: An Alternative Biography. Virgin, 2002. 
Platt, John (editor). The R.E.M. Companion: Two Decades of Commentary. Schirmer, 1998.

Notes

R.E.M. songs
1992 songs
1993 singles
1990s ballads
Sugarland songs
Songs written by Bill Berry
Songs written by Peter Buck
Songs written by Mike Mills
Songs written by Michael Stipe
Warner Records singles
Songs based on actual events
Song recordings produced by Scott Litt
Song recordings produced by Michael Stipe
Song recordings produced by Mike Mills
Song recordings produced by Bill Berry
Song recordings produced by Peter Buck
Music videos directed by Jem Cohen
Pop ballads
Baroque pop songs